is a prefectural university in Tosa Yamada, Kami, Kōchi, Japan.
After its foundation in 1997, Professor Yasuharu Suematsu was its first president.
Kochi University of Technology serves 2056 undergraduate students, 224 Master students and 74 Doctoral students (as of May 1, 2013).

School
 School of Systems Engineering
 School of Environmental Science and Engineering
 School of Information
 School of Economics & Management

Graduate school
Master's Program
Intelligent Mechanical Systems Engineering Course
Electronic and Photonic Systems Engineering Course
Infrastructure Systems Engineering Course
Environmental and Mathematical Sciences Course
Chemistry Course
Life Science and Technology Course
Materials Science and Engineering Course
Informatics Course
Entrepreneur Engineering Management Course
Advanced Educational Practice Course
Doctoral Program
Engineering Course
Entrepreneur Engineering Management Course
Special Course for Mid-career Professionals

Partner Institutions
 Taiwan
National Formosa University
National Kaohsiung First University of Science and Technology
College of Management, National Formosa University
National United University
 China
School of Mechanical Science and Engineering, Huazhong University of Science and Technology
Shenyang University of Technology
Harbin Institute of Technology
Shenyang Pharmaceutical University
Yanshan University
Beijing Institute of Technology
Northeastern University
Harbin Normal University
Jilin University
Southwest Jiaotong University
Kunming University of Science and Technology
Heilongjiang University
Harbin Engineering University
School of Automation & Electrical Engineering, University of Science and Technology Beijing
Antai College of Economics and Management, Shanghai Jiao Tong University
Zhuhai College of Jilin University 
Anhui University
 Korea
Gyeongnam National University of Science and Technology
Mokpo National Maritime University
Yeungnam University
 Thailand
Thammasat University
Faculty of Engineering, Chulalongkorn University
Thai-Nichi Institute of Technology
King Mongkut's Institute of Technology Ladkrabang
King Mongkut's University of Technology Thonburi
 Cambodia
Institute of Technology of Cambodia
 Sri Lanka
University of Moratuwa
 Mongolia
Mongolian University of Science and Technology
 Indonesia
Bandung Institute of Technology
 Hong Kong
Department of Computing, The Hong Kong Polytechnic University
 India
Indian Institute of Technology Bombay
 United States
Massachusetts Institute of Technology
Stanford University, University of Colorado, Colorado Springs
University of Missouri-St. Louis
 Spain
Polytechnic University of Valencia
 Turkey
Istanbul Technical University
 UK
University of South Wales
 Australia
University of Western Sydney
 Czech Republic
University of Hradec Králové
 Germany
Institute for Large Area Microelectronics, University of Stuttgart

References

External links
 Official website  
 Official website 

Educational institutions established in 1997
Universities and colleges in Kōchi Prefecture
Engineering universities and colleges in Japan
1997 establishments in Japan
Public universities in Japan
Kami, Kōchi